KALQ or kalq may refer to:

 KALQ-FM, a radio station (93.5 FM) licensed to serve Alamosa, Colorado, United States
 KALQ keyboard